Turkey has been a member of NATO since 1952, has its second largest army and is the host of the Allied Land Command headquarters. The Incirlik and Konya Airbases have both been involved in several NATO military operations since their establishment. The current Ambassador to NATO is Levent Gümrükçü.

Background 
Turkey sought to become a member of NATO because it wanted a security guarantee against a potential invasion by the Soviet Union, which made several overtures towards control of the Straits of the Dardanelles. In March 1945, the Soviets terminated the Treaty of Friendship and Non Aggression to which the Soviet Union and Turkey had agreed on in 1925. In June 1945, the Soviets demanded the establishment of Soviet bases on the Straits in exchange for a reinstatement of this treaty. The Turkish President Ismet Inönu and the Speaker of the Parliament responded decisively, avowing Turkey's readiness to defend itself.

Accession 
In 1948, Turkey began indicating its desire for NATO membership, and throughout 1948 and 1949 American officials responded negatively towards Turkish requests for inclusion. In May 1950, during Ismet Inönü's presidency, Turkey made its first formal accession bid, which was denied by the NATO member states. In August the same year and just days after Turkey pledged a Turkish contingent for the Korean War, a second bid was made. After the Under Secretary of State Dean Acheson coordinated with France and the United Kingdom in September 1950, the NATO command invited both Greece and Turkey to present their plans for an eventual defense cooperation. Turkey acceded, but expressed disappointment that full membership within NATO was not considered. When US bureaucrat George McGhee visited Turkey in February 1951, Turkish president Celal Bayar emphasized that Turkey expected a full membership, particularly after sending troops to the Korean War. Turkey wanted a security guarantee in case a conflict with the Soviet Union arose. After further evaluations taken at the NATO headquarters and by officials of the Central Intelligence Agency (CIA) and the US Military, it was decided in May 1951 to offer Turkey full membership. The potential role Turkey could play in a war against the Soviet Union was seen as important for NATO. Throughout 1951, the US worked on convincing its fellow NATO allies of the advantages of Turkey's and Greece's membership within the alliance. In February 1952, Bayar signed the  document confirming its accession.

NATO military bases in Turkey 

Incirlik air base has been a military air base since the 1950s and since then has gained more and more importance. It was built between 1951 and 1952 by US military contractors and has been in operation since 1955. In the base are stationed an estimated 50 nuclear weapons. The Konya airbase was established in 1983 and hosts AWACS surveillance jets for NATO. Since December 2012, the headquarters of NATO Land Forces has been located in Buca near İzmir on the Aegean Sea. The Allied Air Command for Southern Europe was also based in Buca between 2004 and 2013. Since 2012, the Kürecik radar station located about 500 km from Iran, is in service as part of the NATO missile defence system.

NATO cooperation

Korea 
The first military deployment in view to NATO was in the Korean War from July 1950 onwards. Turkey deployed 4500 soldiers to the United Nations Command in support of the South Koreans. The Turkish soldiers left a good impression with their American allies, who awarded them with the Distinguished Unit Citation. While Turkey was not a member of NATO at the time, the troops were pledged in view of a potential NATO membership.

Afghanistan 
Between 2001 and 2021, Turkey sent troops to NATO's involvement in Afghanistan. First into the International Security Assistance Force (ISAF) until 2014 and then also to the Resolute Support Mission between 2020 and 2021. After an agreement between the United States and the Taliban for a withdrawal of US and NATO troops, they left from May 2021 onwards.

Syria 
After the Syrian Civil War erupted, Turkey was provided with NATO assistance consisting of a Patriot air defense system in December 2012. The US sent two batteries and 400 soldiers while Germany and the Netherlands pledged modern weaponry for the system, meant against potential missiles strikes from Syria. Turkey also demanded a no-fly zone in Syria, but this was not considered by NATO. The Netherlands withdrew their support in January 2015 and Germany and the United States the same year in August.

Operation Active Endeavour 
After terrorist attacks against the Twin Towers on 11 September 2001, NATO launched Operation Active Endeavour in the Mediterranean Sea to monitor the maritime traffic. The Turkish navy participated in this operation.

Balkan Pact 
The formation of the Balkan Pact (1953) in 1954 by Turkey, Greece and Yugoslavia was initially objected to by Italy, who demanded that NATO to be consulted before other NATO members make new military agreements with Non-NATO countries. But the other members did not see this as necessary and the agreement was signed in Bled, in present-day Slovenia in August 1954.

Relations with NATO member states

Greece  

Greece and Turkey entered the coalition together in 1952. Over the Cyprus dispute with Turkey, Greece's involvement in NATO diminished gradually, as in 1964 Greece withdrew troops, and in 1974, the year of the Turkish invasion of Cyprus, it also withdrew from the military wing of NATO deeming it not worthy to exist if it could not  find a solution to this conflict. In 1980 Greece returned. Turkey later saw allowing this to happen as a mistake, as Erdogan accused Greece of giving refuge to "terrorists".

United States  

The United States is an important NATO ally with over a thousand military personnel stationed in Turkey. The North Atlantic Treaty Regarding the Status of Their Forces (SOFA) signed in 1952 and 1954 also granted NATO the right to build facilities in Turkey such as the Incirlik air base. As after the Turkish invasion of Cyprus in 1974, the USA imposed a weapons embargo because Turkey used military equipment produced in the US, and Turkey expelled all US military personnel except the ones involved in NATO activities. In 1978, the US lifted the weapon embargo. In 2017 Turkey objected to weapons deliveries by the US to People's Defense Units (YPG) because it would violate NATO rules.

France  

As in 2019 the United States decided to withdraw from northeast Syria and make way for Turkey to invade the area despite several NATO member states being opposed to a military operation, French President Emmanuel Macron called NATO brain-dead as he would have preferred better cooperation between NATO allies. The Turkish military operation was directed against the Peoples Defense Units (YPG) involved in the fight against the Islamic State (IS). Macron alleged that Turkey should not expect support from NATO member states if the Turkish military operation was not halted. A diplomatic spat followed, with Recep Tayyip Erdogan asking Macron if he was brain-dead himself and France summoning the Turkish ambassador. The invasion ended after the Vice President of the United States came to an agreement with Turkey for a ceasefire in order to keep US troops involved in the fight against the Islamic state in safety. In May 2022, when Turkey discussed the possibility of an additional incursion, the United States again warned against such an undertaking.

Baltic defense plan 
NATO established a plan to defend the Baltic states after the Russian annexation of the Crimea in 2014. The plan was dubbed Eagle Defender, but was not implemented due to Turkish objections. Turkey wanted NATO officials to classify the People's Defense Units (YPG) as a terrorist organization in exchange for its approval for the plan. In July 2020, Turkey withdrew its objection, and Eagle Defender was able to come into practice.

Nordic accession bids  

When Finland and Sweden made their accession bids to NATO in May 2022, Turkey was the only NATO member to oppose their membership due to the harboring of Kurdistan Workers' Party (PKK), Democratic Union Party (Syria) (PYD), People's Defense Units (YPG) and of Gülen movement members that Turkey sees as terrorists. Diplomats of the two Nordic countries arrived in Ankara to negotiate, but the negotiations were not to the satisfaction of Erdogan, who was offended by the fact that the Syrian Kurdish politician Salih Muslim was seen on Sveriges Television the same day Nordic diplomats were in Ankara to negotiate. Nationalist Movement Party (MHP) leader Devlet Bahçeli suggested that a scenario in which Turkey would leave NATO should be considered an option. In late May 2022, opposition leader Kemal Kiliçdaroglu argued that if the accession row persisted, AKP and MHP would decide to close the Inçirlik Airbase, the Republican People's Party (CHP) would also support it. At the end of May 2022, Turkey's Foreign Minister Mevlüt Çavuşoğlu demanded that Finland and Sweden adapt their laws, if this had to be done in order to address Turkish security concerns.

Turkey's foreign relations with NATO member states

See also
 Foreign relations of Turkey
 Foreign relations of NATO
 Turkey–European Union relations 
 Russia–Turkey relations 
 Turkey–United States relations 
 Finland–Turkey relations 
 Sweden–Turkey relations

References 

Military history of Turkey
Turkey and NATO